Neuer Wall is an upmarket shopping street in Hamburg, Germany.

The 1,200 m of shop-fronts are almost entirely lined with luxury brands. According to international real estate and retail reports, Neuer Wall is among the most exclusive shopping streets in Europe.

It is located in Neustadt, amidst a busy shopping district. It is some 600 m long and stretches from Jungfernstieg on Lake Binnenalster, to Stadthausbrücke on its southern end. Left and right, the buildings' back sides are flanked by Bleichenfleet and the Alster River (here as Kleine Alster and Alsterfleet). Vis-à-vis the 1710 built Görtz-Palais, it has a small square. At the 1864 built Mellin-Passage, it has an interconnecting mall to Alsterarkaden. The street's course is crossed by Poststraße and Bleichenbrücke.

See also 

 List of leading shopping streets and districts by city
 Große Bleichen (parallel shopping street)

References

External links 

Neuer Wall interest group 

Streets in Hamburg
Hamburg-Mitte
Shopping districts and streets in Germany
Tourist attractions in Hamburg